Schnaubelt is a surname. Notable people with the surname include:

 Alois Schnaubelt, a Knight's Cross of the Iron Cross recipient in 1944
 Franz Joseph (artist) (Franz Joseph Schnaubelt, 1914–1994), American artist and author associated with the 1960s American TV show Star Trek
 Rudolph Schnaubelt (1863–1901), suspected bomber in the 1886 Haymarket affair
 Walter Schnaubelt (born 1966), politician in Papua New Guinea